Yverdon-Sport FC is a Swiss football team from the town of Yverdon-les-Bains. The club plays in a green and white strip, and were promoted from the Promotion League, the third tier of Swiss football after winning in the 2020–21 season. The club plays its home matches at the Stade Municipal.

Honours 
Challenge League
Winners (1): 2004–05
Swiss Cup
Runners-up (1): 2001

Current squad

Out on loan

Notable former players 

 Djibril Cissé
  Jean-Philippe Karlen
  Sócrates Oliveira Fonseca

Coaching staff

References

External links 
 Soccerway.com profile 

 
Football clubs in Switzerland
Association football clubs established in 1897
Yverdon-les-Bains
1897 establishments in Switzerland